Marocain, was a frigate in the Free French Naval Forces during World War II and the French Navy post-war. The ship was originally built as USS Marocain (DE-109), an American .

History

World War II
During World War II, Marocain was transferred to the Free French Naval Forces under lend lease on 29 February 1944, and retained the name Marocain.

Marocain participated in Operation Anvil-Dragoon on 15 August 1944.

Ownership of the vessel was transferred to France on 21 April 1952 under the Mutual Defense Assistance Program.

See also
List of escorteurs of the French Navy

References

External links
 

Cannon-class destroyer escorts of the United States Navy
Ships built in Wilmington, Delaware
1944 ships
Cannon-class destroyer escorts of the Free French Naval Forces
World War II frigates of France
Cold War frigates of France
Cannon-class destroyer escorts of the French Navy
Ships built by Dravo Corporation